Armagh Prison in Armagh, Northern Ireland, is a former prison. The construction of the prison began in the 1780 and it was extended in the style of Pentonville Prison in the 1840 and 1850s. For most of its working life Armagh Gaol was the primary women's prison in Ulster. Although the prison is often described as Armagh Women's Gaol, at various points in its history, various wings in the prison were used to hold male prisoners.

During the period of the internment, 33 republican women were interned in the prison from 1973 to 1975. 

On 19 April 1979, Agnes Wallace (40), a prison officer, was shot dead and three colleagues were injured in an Irish National Liberation Army (INLA) gun and grenade attack outside the prison.

The prison was the scene of a protest by female Irish republican prisoners demanding the reinstatement of political status, although the numbers involved were much smaller than in the Maze (also known as Long Kesh) men's prison.  As all women prisoners in Northern Ireland already had the right to wear their own clothes, they did not stage any sort of blanket protest, but the no wash protest included the smearing of menstrual blood on the cell walls.  Three women in Armagh took part in the 1980 hunger strike: Mairéad Nugent, Mary Doyle and Mairéad Farrell, who was killed by the Special Air Service (SAS) in Gibraltar in 1988. No Armagh prisoners took part in the 1981 Irish hunger strike.

The prison closed in 1986. In 2009 it was announced that the prison was to become a hotel.

Armagh Prison was the subject of one of the so-called black spider memos written by Charles, Prince of Wales to the Secretary of State for Northern Ireland in 2004.

References

Further reading
Three Gaols: Images of Crumlin Road, Long Kesh and Armagh Prisons; Author: Robert Kerr. Publisher: MSF Press, [2011] 

Buildings and structures in County Armagh
Defunct prisons in Northern Ireland
Grade B+ listed buildings
Prison museums in Northern Ireland
Museums in County Armagh

Internment camps during the Troubles (Northern Ireland)